Choi Sung-won (born April 30, 1977) is a South Korean professional billiards player. 

He won the 2011 AGIPI Billiard Masters, 2012 Three-Cushion World Cup, 2014 UMB World Three-cushion Championship. 

In the final of the UMB World championship, Choi defeated Torbjorn Blomdahl 40–37.

References

1977 births
Living people
South Korean carom billiards players
World champions in three-cushion billiards
Place of birth missing (living people)